Cymindis velata is a species of ground beetle in the subfamily Harpalinae. It was described by Thomas Vernon Wollaston in 1865.

References

velata
Beetles described in 1865